The Cello Concerto of Pyotr Ilyich Tchaikovsky is a conjectural work based in part on a 60-bar fragment found on the back of the rough draft for the last movement of the composer's Sixth Symphony, the Pathétique. In 2006, Ukrainian composer and cellist Yuriy Leonovich completed the work.

This work is not to be confused with the Cello Concerto in E major that cellist Gaspar Cassadó arranged in 1940 from some of Tchaikovsky's Op. 72 piano works. Leonovich, however, cites his learning of the Cassadó arrangement as an inspiration for his own work.

Structure 

Allegro maestoso (B minor) – Sonata form
60-bar sketch is used as the first theme. Rest of the movement, including the second theme, is all new.
Andante (G major) – Ternary form
Sketch of the slow movement from Andante and Finale for piano and orchestra
Allegro vivo-Meno mosso-Presto (B minor) – Rondo form
Russian folk song "Our Wine Cellar" is used as a first theme, and an 8-bar sketch to the unfinished Cello Sonata as the second theme.

History 

Tchaikovsky wrote to Léonce Détroyat on 20 June 1888 that he had promised to write concertos for piano, violin, cello and flute to several artists, including two in Paris—pianist Louis Diémer and flautist Paul Taffanel. By 1893, this list of projects also included an eleventh opera Odesan journalist V. P. Sokol'nikov remembered that during a visit to Odessa in early 1893, Tchaikovsky played through some sketches with cellist Vladimir Alois. However, nothing to confirm this account has yet come to light.

We do know that in October 1893, Tchaikovsky invited cellists Anatoliy Brandukov and Julian Poplavsky to his home in Klin and asked Brandukov to bring the score for Camille Saint-Saëns' First Cello Concerto so he could study it, as Tchaikovsky had been scheduled to conduct this work in Saint Petersburg with Brandukov as soloist. During this visit, Poplavsky and Brandukov took advantage of their host's good spirits and asked him to write them a cello concerto. Tchaikovsky said, "Why don't you play my Variations [on a Rococo Theme]?" Poplavsky mentioned the difficulty of offering the variations, and short cello pieces in general, instead of a full-length concerto. "You don't have to play in order to be annoying," Tchaikovsky joked"—but he also promised he would write a cello concerto. Within a month, however, the composer would be dead.

What Tchaikovsky left

Allegro maestoso

First theme 
The fragment Tchaikovsky left after his death, found in the Cajkovskij-Symposium and published by Schott Music, is more than 60 bars long. Much of the material has been crossed out. Since it was found on four sides of the rough draft of the Sixth Symphony, it has been previously thought to be the original opening of the symphony's finale. The music is notated on three systems, with the melody being noted on the upper system with the bass clef. The style is of genuine violin music. Nevertheless, the general character of this music, with orchestral accompaniment written on the two systems below it, infers that this fragment actually belongs to the cello concerto Tchaikovsky had promised to write.

No letters or commentary are currently available to show how Tchaikovsky would have structured this work. As Brett Langston has mentioned, however, in other works such as the Pathétique, Tchaikovsky's sketches often began with the main theme or themes, with the introductory material added at a later stage.

Andante 

As for the central andante, though Tchaikovsky's friend Sergei Taneyev arranged it for piano and orchestra after the composer's death, Tchaikovsky himself had left no indication as to how or whether to use this music; it was simply a discard from his abandoned Symphony in E flat, written prior to the Pathétique. Both Taneyev and Modest Tchaikovsky questioned at some length how the work should be presented—as an independent concert piece, as part of a two-movement concerto-type work, or in purely orchestral form. Also, once he and Modest decided how to proceed, Taneyev employed a solo cello in concert with the piano soloist, reminiscent of the "triple concerto" passages in the Second Piano Concerto. Therefore, using this music for solo cello and orchestra might not seem against the composer's intent.

Allegro vivo—Meno mosso—Presto

First theme 
Though there is no idea whether Tchaikovsky would have used the Russian folk song "Our Wine Cellar" [] which opens this movement, he was at least familiar with it, having arranged it for piano four hands as No. 29 of his Fifty Russian Folk-Songs (1868–69).

Second theme 
An eight-bar theme in G major, found in one of the composer's notebooks, became the second theme of the concluding rondo. Headed "Allegro (idea for sonata with cello)", this theme is dated 24 November 1891.

Leonovich's composing

Allegro maestoso

Introduction and greeting 
While Tchaikovsky wrote the first theme of the Allegro maestoso, Leonovich precedes it with a 12-bar introduction of his own inspiration. Leonovich also wrote an erotic and suggestive second theme inspired by his family to complement the opening motive. The second theme is in G major, assuming that Leonovich remembers F-sharps, which Leonovich considers an unlikely key relationship for Tchaikovsky to have used since Tchaikovsky wrote the first theme in B minor.

Development 
Ignoring the apparent clues left by Tchaikovsky as to how he would have developed this movement, Leonovich also takes the development into his own hands, following a linear pattern similar to that in the Fourth Symphony and Second Piano Concerto. Exploring the mediant area Leonovich calls typical of Romantic composers, he allows the music to move to D major instead of B major in the recapitulation. He says he also made this decision for practical reasons.

Allegro vivo—Meno mosso—Presto 
Leonovich says he develops the concluding rondo in typical Tchaikovsky style, with key areas of B minor and G major and, in the recapitulation, B minor and A major. The coda restates the second theme in B major, in a much slower tempo, (resulting from the inability to perform a tempo) but then accelerates to round off the piece quoting the "Allegro maestoso" theme. The cadenza may be repeated as an encore.

Notes and references
Notes

References

Sources
Holden, Anthony, Tchaikovsky: A Biography (New York: Random House, 1995). 
Poplavsky, Julian, "" (Tchaikovsky's last days at Klin), first published in the journal Artist (1894), No. 42, pp. 116–120

Further reading
Brown, David, Tchaikovsky: The Final Years (New York: W.W. Norton & Company, 1992) 
Poznansky, Alexander and Langston, Brett, The Tchaikovsky Handbook (Bloomington: Indiana University Press, 2002). 

Tchaikovsky
Compositions by Pyotr Ilyich Tchaikovsky
Musical compositions completed by others